Meshkat (pronounced /meʃ'ka:t/ with stress on second syllable; also known as Moshkān, Mashgān, and Mashkān) is a city in the Central District of Kashan County, Isfahan Province, Iran.  At the 2016 census, its population was 5,357, in 1,687 families.

Situation

Meshkat is the northernmost town in Esfahan Province, Iran. It has a population of 5,357, in 2016). It is situated between Qom-Kashan Highway (named Amir Kabir Highway) on the South and Qom-Kashan International road on the north; these two main roads connect the north of the country to its south. It is situated in km 25 Kashan-Qom road.

It has a semi-warm climate. The people of this town are mainly farmers, factory workers or craftsmen. The most important agricultural products of Meshkat include wheat, pomegranate, greengage, cotton, among others. It is endowed with several brooks some of which are flowing all year long. Trees of various types help moderate the temperature in hot season; when passing by the thick vegetation areas beside the main road to meshkat, one could easily feel the considerable drop of temperature.

Recently, a Calcium Bicarbonate Factory has been built near this town, promising prosperous economic future for the town.
Meshkat is southerly limited to the Tehran-Ghom-Esfahan Expressway, while the main asphalt road, which connects Tehran to the south of the country, passes directly through this town. Also, a railroad passes by the northern side of the Meshkat's suburbs.

References

External links
official website of the municipality of Meshkat

Kashan County

Cities in Isfahan Province